Yoon Ju-Il (born 10 March 1980) is a South Korean football winger.

Club career 
Yoon is a foundation player for Daegu FC, appearing for the club in its debut season in the K-League. Yoon would stay for four seasons, playing over one hundred matches for the club in all competitions. Although he played in the majority of the club's matches during the 2003 to 2005 seasons, limited matchplay in 2006 saw Yoon shift to Incheon United for 2007 in search of regular first team action. However, the move was not successful, and Yoon moved again midseason to the Chunnam Dragons. He still struggled to establish a regular place in the senior squad, and for the 2010 season, has moved to Busan IPark.

Club career statistics

External links

1980 births
Living people
Association football midfielders
South Korean footballers
Daegu FC players
Incheon United FC players
Jeonnam Dragons players
Busan IPark players
Suwon FC players
K League 1 players
K League 2 players
Korea National League players